Watauga can refer to:

Places
Watauga, Kentucky
 Watauga County, North Carolina
 Watauga, South Dakota
 Watauga, Tennessee
 Watauga, Texas

Bodies of Water
 Watauga Lake in Tennessee
 The Watauga River in North Carolina and Tennessee

Ships
 USS Watauga (1864), a steam frigate planned for the United States Navy during the American Civil War that was never built

Other
 The Watauga Association, a pre-revolutionary autonomous American government
 The Watauga Democrat, a newspaper published in Boone, North Carolina
 Watauga College, a residential college at Appalachian State University in Boone, North Carolina
 The Watauga Dam, on the Watauga and Elk Rivers in Carter County, Tennessee